Shorea conica is a species of plant in the family Dipterocarpaceae. It is a tree endemic to Sumatra. It is a critically endangered plant species.

References

IUCN Red List of Threatened Species. 

conica
Endemic flora of Sumatra
Trees of Sumatra
Critically endangered flora of Asia
Taxonomy articles created by Polbot